Karen Gardiner-Kah (born 17 May 1960) is an Australian short track speed skater and long track speed skater.

Career
She competed in short track speed skating at the 1992 Winter Olympics and the 1994 Winter Olympics.

Gardiner represented her nation twice at the World Allround Speed Skating Championships for Women. In 1986, finishing 30th overall and in 1987, finishing 28th overall. She competed at World Sprint Speed Skating Championships for Women in 1987 (30th overall). She also competed at other international competitions, including at ISU Speed Skating World Cups.

She set a total of 15 national records in 1986 and 1987.

Personal life
She is married to fellow Australian speed skater John Kah. Their daughter Jamie Kah is a leading jockey.

References

External links
 

1960 births
Living people
Australian female short track speed skaters
Olympic short track speed skaters of Australia
Short track speed skaters at the 1992 Winter Olympics
Short track speed skaters at the 1994 Winter Olympics
Sportspeople from Adelaide
Australian female speed skaters